Labdia issikii is a moth in the family Cosmopterigidae. It was described by Kuroko in 1892. It is known from Japan.

References

Natural History Museum Lepidoptera generic names catalog

Labdia
Moths described in 1892